Agnès Mellon (born 17 January 1958) is a French soprano who specializes in baroque music.

Biography 
Agnès Mellon started her career in 1981 with the baroque ensemble Les Arts Florissants, directed by William Christie, with whom, between 1981 and 1993, she interpreted Marc-Antoine Charpentier, Monteverdi, Luigi Rossi, Michel Lambert, Henry Purcell, Jean-Baptiste Lully, Michel Pignolet de Montéclair, Jean-Philippe Rameau and others. During the 1980s, she was one of the ensemble's regular singers, together with Guillemette Laurens, Jill Feldman, Dominique Visse, Étienne Lestringant, Michel Laplénie, Philippe Cantor, Gregory Reinhart, and François Fauché.

Starting in 1985, Mellon also worked under the direction of Philippe Herreweghe, with La Chapelle Royale (1985–1990) and the Collegium Vocale Gent (1990–1996), interpreting Charpentier, Heinrich Schütz, Monteverdi, Jean Gilles, and Johann Sebastian Bach.

At the end of the 1980s, she worked regularly with the Belgian ensemble Ricercar Consort, under the artistic direction of the Belgian musicologist . She also worked with various conductors, including Dominique Visse, René Jacobs, Marc Minkowski, John Eliot Gardiner, Christophe Rousset, and Gérard Lesne.

Beginning in the 1990s, she dedicated herself to teaching. She also participates in master classes in (Paris, Montreal, and Kyoto). In 1992, she gave an exceptional interpretation of Henry Purcell's songs, traditionally interpreted only by countertenors such as Alfred Deller and James Bowman. In 1997, she founded her own baroque ensemble, Barcarole, whose first recording was released in 2005.

Recordings 
Mellon has made many recordings, most of them in the field of baroque music.

With Les Arts Florissants 
 1981 : Pastorale sur la Naissance de N.S. Jésus-Christ H.483, In Nativitatem D.N.J.C. Canticum H.414, Marc-Antoine Charpentier
 1981 : Altri Canti, Claudio Monteverdi
1982 : Antienne "O" de l'Avent H.37- 43, Marc-Antoine Charpentier
1982 : Les Arts Florissants H.487, Marc-Antoine Charpentier
 1982 : Actéon H.481, Marc-Antoine Charpentier
 1982 : Oratorios (Il pecator pentito, O Cecità del misero mortale), Luigi Rossi
 1983 : Un Oratorio de Noël  "In nativitatem Domini canticum" H.416, Sur la Naissance de N.S. Jésus-Christ H.482, Marc-Antoine Charpentier
 1983 : Il Ballo delle Ingrate, Claudio Monteverdi
 1984 : Airs de Cour, Michel Lambert
 1984 : Médée H.491, Marc-Antoine Charpentier
 1985 : Le Reniement de Saint Pierre H.424, Marc-Antoine Charpentier
 1986 : Dido and Aeneas, Henry Purcell
 1987 : Atys, Jean-Baptiste Lully
 1988 : La Mort de Didon, Michel Pignolet de Monteclair
 1989 : Oratorio per la Settimana Santa, Luigi Rossi
 1991 : Orfeo, Luigi Rossi
 1993 : Castor et Pollux, Jean-Philippe Rameau
These recordings were all published by Harmonia Mundi France.

With La Chapelle Royale 
 1985 : "Motet Pour l'Offertoire de la Messe Rouge" H.434, "Oculi omnium" H.346, "Pour la seconde fois que le Saint Sacrement vient au même reposoir" H.372 and Miserere H.219, Marc-Antoine Charpentier
 1987 : Musikalische Exequien, Heinrich Schütz
 1987 : Vespro della Beata Vergina, Claudio Monteverdi (Chapelle Royale, Collegium Vocale, Saqueboutiers, Toulouse)
 1990 : Requiem, Jean Gilles
 1990 : Magnificat BWV 243, Johann Sebastian Bach
These recordings were all published by Harmonia Mundi France.

With Ricercar Consort 
 1988 : Deutsche Barock Kantaten (III) (Schein, Tunder, Buxtehude)
 1989 : Deutsche Barock Kantaten (V) (Hammerschmidt, Selle Johann Hermann Schein, Heinrich Schütz, Franz Tunder, Weckmann, Lübeck)
 1989 : Motets à deux voix, Henri Dumont
These recordings were all published by Ricercar.

With Collegium Vocale Gent 
 1990 : Missae, BWV 234 & 235, Sanctus, BWV 238, Johann Sebastian Bach
 1991 : Missae, BWV 233 & 236,  Johann Sebastian Bach
 1993 : Kantaten, BWV 39, 93 & 107, Johann Sebastian Bach
 1996 : Geistliche Chormusik, Heinrich Schütz

These recordings were all published by Virgin Classics.

With Barcarole, founded and directed by Agnès Mellon 
 2005 : Les Déesses outragées, cantatas of Louis-Nicolas Clérambault, Philippe Courbois and François Colin de Blamont
 2011 : Parole e querele d'amore

Recordings 

 1987: Marc-Antoine Charpentier: "Vêpres Solennelles" H.540, H.190, H.50, H.149, H.52, H.150, H.51, H.161, H.191, H.65, H.77, John Elwes, Ian Honeyman, tenors, Agnès Mellon, Brigitte Bellamy, sopranos, Dominique Visse, Jean Nirouet, countertenors, Philippe Cantor, Jacques Bona, baritones, Choeur régional- Nord Pas de Calais, La Grande Écurie et la Chambre du Roy, Odile Bailleux, organ, conducted by Jean-Claude Malgoire (2 CD CBS Sony 1987)
 1987 : Die sieben Worte Jesu Christi am Kreuz by Heinrich Schütz, Ensemble Clément Janequin (dir. Dominique Visse), Saqueboutiers, Toulouse
 1987 : Duos et Cantates, Giacomo Carissimi, Concerto Vocale, dir. René Jacobs
 1988 : Les Comédies-Ballets, Lully-Molière, Les Musiciens du Louvre, dir. Marc Minkowski
 1988 : Scylla et Glaucus, Jean-Marie Leclair, Monteverdi Choir & English Baroque Soloists, dir. John Eliot Gardiner
 1992 : Songs from Orpheus Britannicus, Henry Purcell, interpreted by Agnès Mellon, Christophe Rousset and Wieland Kuijken
 1993 : Cantiques Spirituels de Jean Racine, Pascal Colasse, Les Talens Lyriques, dir. Christophe Rousset
 1993 : Motets à une ou deux voix, Daniel Danielis, Les Talens Lyriques, dir. Christophe Rousset
 1993 : Leçons de Ténèbres, Office du Vendredi Saint H.105, H.95, H.140, H.133, H.130, H.99, H.100, Marc-Antoine Charpentier, Il Seminario Musicale, dir. Gérard Lesne
 2003 : Maria, Madre de Dio (Handel, Ferrandini, Scarlatti), ensemble Arion, dir. Monica Huggett
 1997 : Chabrier mélodies (with Franck Leguérinel); Françoise Tillard (piano) - Timpani

Opera roles 
Agnès Mellon has played several opera roles, all of them in the field of baroque music:
 Actéon, Marc-Antoine Charpentier (Diane)
 Médée, Marc-Antoine Charpentier (Créuse)
 Atys, Jean-Baptiste Lully (Sangaride)
 Orfeo, Luigi Rossi (Orfeo)
 Castor et Pollux, Jean-Philippe Rameau (Télaïre)
 Scylla et Glaucus, Jean-Marie Leclair (Vénus)

References

External links 
 Agnès Mellon, la voie éclectique

1958 births
Living people
People from Épinay-sur-Seine
French operatic sopranos
French performers of early music
Women performers of early music